Nimji is a surname. Notable people with this surname include:

 Khaaliqa Nimji (born 1998), Kenyan squash player
 Muqtadir Nimji (born 1999), Kenyan squash player